Goodrow is a surname. Notable people with the surname include:

 Barclay Goodrow (born 1993), Canadian professional ice hockey player
 Garry Goodrow (1933–2014), American actor